Galilee Community General Jewish Hospital of Uganda is a 50-bed community hospital in the Masanafu neighborhood, in Lubaga Division, in Kampala, the capital and largest city in the country.

Location
The coordinates of Galilee Community Hospital are 0°19'54.0"N, 32°32'09.0"E (Latitude:0.331669; Longitude:32.535836).

See also
List of hospitals in Uganda

References

Hospitals in Kampala
Hospitals established in 2009
2009 establishments in Uganda